The UK Albums Chart is one of many music charts compiled by the Official Charts Company that calculates the best-selling albums of the week in the United Kingdom. Since 2004 the chart has been based on the sales of both physical albums and digital downloads. This list shows albums that peaked in the Top 10 of the UK Albums Chart during 2010, as well as albums which peaked in 2009 and 2011 but were in the top 10 in 2010. The entry date is when the album appeared in the top 10 for the first time (week ending, as published by the Official Charts Company, which is six days after the chart is announced).

One-hundred and fifty-two albums were in the top ten this year. Sixteen albums from 2009 remained in the top 10 for several weeks at the beginning of the year, while Loud by Rihanna, Sigh No More by Mumford & Sons, The Beginning by The Black Eyed Peas and The Lady Killer by CeeLo Green were all released in 2010 but did not reach their peak until 2011. Crazy Love by Michael Bublé, Lungs by Florence + the Machine, Only Revolutions by Biffy Clyro and The Hits by Will Young were the albums from 2009 to reach their peak in 2010. Thirteen artists scored multiple entries in the top 10 in 2010. Ellie Goulding, Justin Bieber, Katy Perry, Olly Murs and Tinie Tempah were among the many artists who achieved their first UK charting top 10 album in 2010.

The first number-one album of the year was Crazy Love by Michael Bublé. Overall, thirty-two different albums peaked at number-one in 2010, with thirty-two unique artists hitting that position.

Background

Multiple entries
One-hundred and fifty-two albums charted in the top 10 in 2010, with one-hundred and thirty-six albums reaching their peak this year (including 1962–1966, 1967–1970 and Simply Red 25: The Greatest Hits, which charted in previous years but reached a peak on their latest chart run).

Thirteen artists scored multiple entries in the top 10 in 2010. Glee cast had five top 10 albums, the most of any artist this year. André Rieu, The Beatles, The Black Eyed Peas, Cheryl, JLS, the Johann Strauss Orchestra, Lady Gaga, Peter Andre, Rihanna, Robbie Williams, Susan Boyle and Take That were the acts who had two top 10 albums this year. André Rieu, the Johann Strauss Orchestra, Peter Andre and Rihanna's two entries were both released this year, with 1962–1966 (The Red Album) and 1967–1970 (The Blue Album) by The Beatles returning after making the top ten before.

Chart debuts
Forty-five artists achieved their first top 10 album in 2010 as a lead artist. André Rieu and the Johann Strauss Orchestra both had one more hit album, while the Glee cast had four other entries in their breakthrough year.

The following table (collapsed on desktop site) does not include acts who had previously charted as part of a group and secured their first top 10 solo album, or featured appearances on compilations or other artists recordings.

Notes
Brandon Flowers released his debut solo album in 2010, the number-one hit Flamingo. He had recorded three other chart toppers with his group The Killers up to this point: Hot Fuss, Sam's Town and Day & Age.

Mark Ronson & The Business Intl. was a moniker used by Mark Ronson for his album Record Collection - he had already landed a top 10 album, Version, which had peaked at number 2 in 2007.

CeeLo Green took a solo album into the top 10 at the third attempt, The Lady Killer rising to number three at the start of 2011. He was in the group Gnarls Barkley who had a big hit in 2006 with St. Elsewhere.

Soundtracks
Soundtrack albums for various films entered the top 10 throughout the year. These included Alvin & the Chipmunks: The Squeakquel and Iron Man 2.

The cast of the TV series Glee also had five top-ten albums in 2010. This included Glee: The Music, Volume 1, Glee: The Music, Volume 2, Glee: The Music, Volume 3 Showstoppers, Glee: The Music, Journey to Regionals (EP) and Glee: The Music, The Power of Madonna (EP).

Best-selling albums
Take That had the best-selling album of the year with Progress. The album spent seventeen weeks in the top 10 (including seven weeks at number one), sold almost 1.633 million copies and was certified 6× platinum by the BPI. Crazy Love by Michael Bublé came in second place. Lady Gaga's The Fame, Loud from Rihanna and The Defamation of Strickland Banks by Plan B made up the top five. Albums by Paolo Nutini, Alicia Keys, Florence + the Machine, Eminem and Mumford & Sons were also in the top ten best-selling albums of the year.

Top-ten albums
Key

Entries by artist

The following table shows artists who achieved two or more top 10 entries in 2009, including albums that reached their peak in 2009 or 2011. The figures only include main artists, with featured artists and appearances on compilation albums not counted individually for each artist. The total number of weeks an artist spent in the top ten in 2010 is also shown.

Notes

 Sigh No More reached its peak of number two on 26 February 2011 (week ending).
 Sunny Side Up re-entered the top 10 at number-one on 9 January 2010 (week ending) for 19 weeks and at number 8 on 14 August 2010 (week ending) for 3 weeks.
 The E.N.D. re-entered the top 10 at number 10 on 20 February 2010 (week ending) for 2 weeks, at number 10 on 15 May 2010 (week ending) for 2 weeks and at number 3 on 3 July 2010 (week ending) for 2 weeks.
 Lungs re-entered the top 10 at number 6 on 9 January 2010 (week ending) for 17 weeks, at number 6 on 15 May 2010 (week ending) for 5 weeks and at number 10 on 31 July 2010 (week ending).
 One Love re-entered the top 10 at number 10 on 10 July 2010 (week ending).
 The Resistance re-entered the top 10 at number 8 on 9 January 2010 (week ending).
 The Blueprint 3 re-entered the top 10 at number 10 on 27 February 2010 (week ending).
 Turn It Up re-entered the top 10 at number 10 on 23 January 2010 (week ending) for 3 weeks, at number 10 on 19 June 2010 (week ending) and at number 9 on 30 October 2010 (week ending).
 Crazy Love re-entered the top 10 at number 8 on 20 February 2010 (week ending), at number 6 on 20 March 2010 (week ending), at number 2 on 5 June 2010 (week ending) for 5 weeks, at number 10 on 7 August 2010 (week ending) for 5 weeks, at number 7 on 30 October 2010 (week ending) for 11 weeks and at number 7 on 16 April 2011 (week ending).
 JLS re-entered the top 10 at number 8 on 6 March 2010 (week ending).
 Reality Killed the Video Star re-entered the top 10 at number 8 on 27 February 2010 (week ending).
 Only Revolutions re-entered the top 10 at number 9 on 6 February 2010 (week ending) and at number 3 on 11 September 2010 (week ending) for 2 weeks.
 3 Words re-entered the top 10 at number 10 on 2 January 2010 (week ending).
 Sigh No More re-entered the top 10 at number 10 on 6 March 2010 (week ending) for 2 weeks, at number 9 on 27 March 2010 (week ending) for 4 weeks, at number 10 on 26 June 2010 (week ending) for 8 weeks, at number 7 on 4 September 2010 (week ending) for 3 weeks, at number 9 on 2 October 2010 (week ending) for 4 weeks, at number 6 on 2 January 2011 (week ending) for 3 weeks and at number 2 on 26 February 2011 (week ending) for 3 weeks.
 Forever Vienna re-entered the top 10 at number 10 on 13 March 2010 (week ending).
 The Element of Freedom re-entered the top 10 at number 8 on 29 May 2010 (week ending) for 10 weeks.
 My World re-entered the top 10 at number 3 on 3 April 2010 (week ending) for 5 weeks following the release of the album My World 2.0. (known in the UK as My Worlds). It re-entered the top 10 for a second time at number 7 on 15 May 2010 (week ending).
 Lights re-entered the top 10 at number 9 on 8 January 2011 (week ending) for 6 weeks and at number 10 on 14 May 2011 (week ending).
 Jason Derulo re-entered the top 10 at number 10 on 14 August 2010 (week ending) for 2 weeks.
 Glee: The Music, Volume 1 re-entered the top 10 at number 7 on 10 April 2010 (week ending) for 2 weeks.
 The Defamation of Strickland Banks re-entered the top 10 at number 9 on 26 June 2010 (week ending) for 12 weeks, at number 6 on 16 October 2010 (week ending) for 3 weeks, at number 3 on 8 January 2011 (week ending) for 5 weeks and at number 7 on 26 February 2011 (week ending) for 2 weeks.
 Piano Man: The Very Best of Billy Joel originally peaked outside the top 10 at number 40 upon its initial release in 2004. It entered the top 20 on 22 July 2006 (week ending) for 9 weeks, peaking at number 11. It reached top 10 for the first time on 26 July 2008 (week ending) and peaked at number 9.
 Recovery re-entered the top 10 at number 9 on 16 October 2010 (week ending).
 Eliza Doolittle re-entered the top 10 at number 9 on 22 January 2011 (week ending) for 3 weeks.
 XX re-entered the top 10 at number 3 on 18 September 2010 (week ending) for 3 weeks.
 Teenage Dream re-entered the top 10 at number 5 on 30 October 2010 (week ending) for 2 weeks, at number 9 on 20 November 2010 (week ending) for 2 weeks, at number 8 on 8 January 2011 (week ending) for 2 weeks, at number 8 on 29 October 2011 (week ending) and at number 6 on 7 April 2012 (week ending).
 Hands All Over re-entered the top 10 at number 10 on 29 October 2011 (week ending).
 Simply Red 25: The Greatest Hits peaked at number 9 upon its initial release in 2008.
 Disc-Overy re-entered the top 10 at number 4 on 8 January 2011 (week ending) for 4 weeks and at number 6 on 26 February 2011 (week ending) for 2 weeks.
 In and Out of Consciousness: Greatest Hits 1990–2010 re-entered the top 10 at number 7 on 25 December 2010 (week ending).
 Come Around Sundown re-entered the top 10 at number 8 on 4 December 2010 (week ending) and at number 7 on 18 December 2010 (week ending) for 3 weeks.
 1967-1970 (also known as The Blue Album) peaked at number 2 upon its initial release in 1973.
 1962-1966 (also known as The Red Album) peaked at number 3 upon its initial release in 1973.
 The Wanted re-entered the top 10 at number 5 on 8 January 2011 (week ending).
 Seasons of My Soul re-entered the top 10 at number 6 on 15 January 2011 (week ending) for 3 weeks and at number 9 on 12 February 2011 (week ending) for 2 weeks.
 The Lady Killer re-entered the top 10 at number 4 on 15 January 2011 (week ending) for 5 weeks, at number 9 on 5 March 2011 (week ending) for 2 weeks, at number 8 on 23 April 2011 (week ending) for 3 weeks, at number 9 on 16 July 2011 (week ending) and at number 8 on 22 October 2011 (week ending).
 Progress re-entered the top 10 at number 10 on 19 February 2011 (week ending) for 2 weeks, at number 9 on 11 June 2011 (week ending) and at number 3 on 25 June 2011 (week ending) for 5 weeks.
 Loud re-entered the top 10 at number 9 on 2 July 2011 (week ending), at number 8 on 16 July 2011 (week ending) for 3 weeks, at number 10 on 13 August 2011 (week ending) and at number 10 on 3 September 2011 (week ending).
 Outta This World re-entered the top 10 at number 10 on 5 March 2011 (week ending).
 Figure includes album that peaked in 2009.
 Figure includes album that first charted in 2009 but peaked in 2010.
 Figure includes album that peaked in 2011.

See also
2010 in British music
List of number-one albums from the 2000s (UK)

References
General

Specific

External links
2010 album chart archive at the Official Charts Company (click on relevant week)

United Kingdom top 10 albums
Top 10 albums
2010